Sidi Dauda Bage is a Nigerian jurist and former Justice of the Supreme Court of Nigeria. He was appointed in 2016 by President Muhammadu Buhari. On 26 March 2019, he was selected as the 17th Emir of Lafia.

See also 
List of Hausa people

References 

1956 births
Living people
Nigerian jurists
Supreme Court of Nigeria justices
Place of birth missing (living people)